The Manhattan Building is a 16-story building at 431 South Dearborn Street in Chicago, Illinois. It was designed by architect William Le Baron Jenney and constructed from 1889 to 1891. It is the oldest surviving skyscraper in the world to use a purely skeletal supporting structure. The building was the first home of the Paymaster Corporation, and is listed on the National Register of Historic Places on March 16, 1976, and designated a Chicago Landmark on July 7, 1978.

Architecture
The distinctive bow windows provide light into the building's interior spaces, and the combination of a granite facade for the lower floors and brick facade for the upper stories helps lighten the load placed on the internal steel framework.  The north and south walls of tile are supported on steel cantilevers that carry the load back to the internal supporting structure.

The versatility and strength of metal frame construction made the skyscraper possible, as evidenced by this structure, which reached the then-astounding height of 16 stories in 1891. Its architect was a pioneer in the development of tall buildings.

References

See also 
 Chicago architecture

Chicago school architecture in Illinois
Commercial buildings on the National Register of Historic Places in Chicago
Residential skyscrapers in Chicago
Residential condominiums in Chicago
Commercial buildings completed in 1891
Architecture in Chicago
Chicago Landmarks
1891 establishments in Illinois